The following is a list of all team-to-team transactions that occurred in the National Hockey League during the 2016–17 NHL season. It lists which team each player has been traded to, signed by, or claimed by, and for which player(s) or draft pick (s), if applicable. Players who have retired are also listed. The 2016–17 NHL trade deadline was on March 1, 2017. Any players traded or claimed off waivers after this date were eligible to play up until, but not in the 2017 Stanley Cup playoffs.

Retirement

Contract terminations 
A team and player may mutually agree to terminate a player's contract at any time.

For more details on contract terminations:

Teams may buy out player contracts (after the conclusion of a season) for a portion of the remaining value of the contract, paid over a period of twice the remaining length of the contract. This reduced number and extended period is applied to the cap hit as well.
If the player was under the age of 26 at the time of the buyout the player's pay and cap hit will reduced by a factor of 2/3 over the extended period. 
If the player was 26 or older at the time of the buyout the player's pay and cap hit will reduced by a factor of 1/3 over the extended period. 
If the player was 35 or older at the time of signing the contract the player's pay will be reduced by a factor of 1/3, but the cap hit will not be reduced over the extended period.

All players must clear waivers before having a contract terminated. Injured players cannot be bought out.

Free agency 
Note: This does not include players who have re-signed with their previous team as an unrestricted free agent or as a restricted free agent.

Imports
This section is for players who were not previously on contract with NHL teams in the past season. Listed is their previous team and the league that they belonged to.

Trades
* Retained Salary Transaction: Each team is allowed up to three contracts on their payroll where they have retained salary in a trade (i.e. the player no longer plays with Team A due to a trade to Team B, but Team A still retains some salary). Only up to 50% of a player's contract can be kept, and only up to 15% of a team's salary cap can be taken up by retained salary. A contract can only be involved in one of these trades twice.

Hover over retained salary or conditional transactions/considerations for more information.

June

July

August

October

November

December

January

February

March

April

May

June (2017)

Waivers 
Once an NHL player has played in a certain number of games or a set number of seasons has passed since the signing of his first NHL contract (see here), that player must be offered to all of the other NHL teams before he can be assigned to a minor league affiliate.

Expansion Draft 

The 2016–17 NHL season saw the entrance of a 31st team to the league, the Vegas Golden Knights. While the team does not begin play until the 2017–18 NHL season, the team was active and able to make trades with the other 30 teams and sign free agents starting March 1, 2017. In order to create a roster, an Expansion Draft was held June 21, 2017.

Vegas was required to select one player from each of the existing teams, for a total of 30 players selected. At least 20 of the players selected had to be on contracted for the 2017–18 NHL season and Vegas had to take a minimum of number of player at each position. Each of the thirty other teams were allowed to protect up to 11 players, but also had to expose a minimum number of players with NHL experience for Vegas to select at each position. Teams were required to protect players with No-Movement Clauses (or the player must waive it); all first- and second-year professionals, as well as all unsigned draft choices, and players determined to have career threatening injuries were exempt from selection and were not be counted toward their teams' protection limits.

On June 17, 2017, a waiver and trade freeze, as well as moratorium on signing players to new contracts went into effect for all teams except for Vegas, and each team had to submit their expansion protection lists. Vegas had from June 18–21 to negotiate with all exposed free agents; if Vegas came to terms with a player in this time, that player counted as their previous team's expansion selection and Vegas was not able to select another player from that team. On June 21, 2017, Vegas' final roster was submitted, and was announced as part of the NHL Awards Ceremony that evening. Any players picked by Vegas cannot be traded back to their former team before January 1, 2018, nor can they have their contracts bought out by Vegas until after the completion of the 2017–18 season.

See also
2016–17 NHL season
2016 NHL Entry Draft
2017 NHL Entry Draft
2016 in sports
2017 in sports
2015–16 NHL transactions
2017–18 NHL transactions
2017 NHL Expansion Draft

References

External links
2016 NHL Free Agent Tracker
2016-17 NHL Trade Tracker
TSN transactions
The Hockey News transactions
Elite Prospects Confirmed Transfers

Transactions
National Hockey League transactions